Sharm El Sheikh, commonly abbreviated to Sharm, is an Egyptian city on the southern tip of the Sinai Peninsula, in South Sinai Governorate, on the coastal strip along the Red Sea. Its population is approximately 53,670 . Sharm El Sheikh is the administrative hub of Egypt's South Sinai Governorate, which includes the smaller coastal towns of Dahab and Nuweiba as well as the mountainous interior, St. Catherine and Mount Sinai. The city and holiday resort is a significant centre for tourism in Egypt, while also attracting many international conferences and diplomatic meetings.
Sharm El Sheikh is one of the Asian cities of Egypt, it's also called (The city of peace).

Name
Sharm El Sheikh ("bay of the wise") is also known as the "City of Peace"; Egyptian Arabic: "Madinet Es-Salam", referring to the large number of International Peace Conferences that have been held there. Amongst Egyptians and also many visitors, the name of the city is commonly shortened to "Sharm", which is its common name in Egyptian Arabic. The name is also sometimes written as "Sharm el-Cheikh" or "Sharm el-Sheik" in English.

Geography and history

Sharm El Sheikh is on a promontory overlooking the Straits of Tiran at the mouth of the Gulf of Aqaba. Its strategic importance led to its transformation from a fishing village into a major port and naval base for the Egyptian Navy. It was conquered by Israel during the Suez Crisis of 1956 and returned to Egypt in 1957. A United Nations peacekeeping force was stationed there until the 1967 Six-Day War when it was reoccupied by Israel. Sharm El Sheikh remained under Israeli control until the Sinai Peninsula was returned to Egypt in 1982 after the Egypt–Israel peace treaty of 1979. Egypt's then-president Hosni Mubarak designated Sharm El Sheikh as The City of Peace in 1982 and the Egyptian government began a policy of encouraging the development of the city. Egyptian businessmen and investors, along with global investors contributed to building several mega projects, including mosques and churches. The city is now an international tourist destination, and environmental zoning laws limit the height of buildings to avoid obscuring the natural beauty of the surroundings.

A hierarchical planning approach was adopted for the Gulf of Aqaba, whereby the area's components were evaluated and subdivided into zones, cities and centers. In accordance with this approach, the Gulf of Aqaba zone was subdivided into four cities: Taba, Nuweiba, Dahab and Sharm El Sheikh. Sharm El Sheikh city has been subdivided into five homogeneous centers, namely Nabq, Ras Nusrani, Naama Bay, Umm Sid and Sharm El Maya.

Sharm El Sheikh city, with Naama Bay, Hay el Nour, Hadaba, Rowaysat, Montazah and  form a metropolitan area.

The site off the shore gun emplacements at Ras Nasrani opposite Tiran Island is now a diving area.

In 2005, the resort was hit by the Sharm El Sheikh terrorist attacks, which were carried out by an extremist Islamist organisation targeting Egypt's tourist industry. Eighty-eight people were killed, the majority of them Egyptians, and over 200 were wounded by the attack, making it the second deadliest terrorist attack in the country's history.

The city has played host to a number of important Middle Eastern peace conferences, including the 4 September 1999 agreement to restore Palestinian self-rule over the Gaza Strip. A second summit was held at Sharm on 17 October 2000 following the outbreak of the second Palestinian intifada, but it failed to end the violence. A summit was held in the city on 3 August 2005 on developments in the Arab world, such as the situation in the Arab–Israeli conflict. Again in 2007, an important ministerial meeting took place in Sharm, where dignitaries discussed Iraqi reconstruction. The World Economic Forum on the Middle East was hosted by Sharm el-Sheikh in 2006 and 2008.

Amidst the 2011 Egyptian protests, then-president Mubarak reportedly went to Sharm El Sheikh and resigned there on 11 February 2011.

In November 2022, the United Nations Climate Change Conference (COP27) was held in Sharm el-Sheikh. This conference led to the first loss and damage fund being created.

Climate

The city experiences a subtropical arid climate, classified by the Köppen–Geiger system as hot desert (BWh). Temperatures are just short of a tropical climate.

Marsa Alam, Kosseir and Sharm El Sheikh have the warmest winter night temperatures of cities and resorts in Egypt.

Economy and tourism

Sharm El Sheikh was formerly a port, but commercial shipping has been greatly reduced as the result of strict environmental laws introduced in the 1990s. Until 1982, there was only a military port in Sharm El Sheikh, on the northern part of Marsa Bareka. The civilian port development started in the mid-1980s, when the Sharem-al-Maya Bay became the city's main yacht and service port. 

Sharm El Sheikh's major industry is foreign and domestic tourism, owing to its landscape, year-round dry climate with long hot summers and warm winters and its long beaches. Its waters are clear and calm for most of the year  and have become popular for various watersports, particularly recreational scuba diving and snorkeling. There is scope for scientific tourism due to the diversity of marine life: 250 different coral reefs and 1000 species of fish. 

These natural resources, together with its proximity to tourist markets in Europe, have stimulated rapid growth in tourism in the region. The number of resorts has increased from three in 1982 to ninety-one in 2000. Guest nights also increased in that period from sixteen thousand to 5.1 million. Companies that have invested in the city include Hyatt, Accor, Marriott International, Le Méridien, Four Seasons Hotels, and Ritz-Carlton, with categories of three to five stars. In 2007, the first aqua park hotel resort opened in the area.

Sharm is also home to a congress center, located along Peace Road, where international political and economic meetings have been held, including peace conferences, ministerial meetings, world bank meetings, and Arab League meetings.  The Maritim Sharm El Sheikh International Congress Centre can host events and congresses for up to 4,700 participants.

There is nightlife in Sharm El Sheikh. The colorful handicraft stands of the local Bedouin culture are a popular attraction.  Ras Mohammed, at the southernmost tip of the peninsula, has been designated a national park, protecting the area's wildlife, natural landscape, shoreline and coral reef. There are a number of international hotels and restaurants in the centre of Sharm, in the area known as Naama Bay, with golf courses and other leisure facilities further up the coast.

The Nabq Managed Resource Protected Area is a  area of mangroves, coral reefs, fertile dunes, birds and wildlife.

As of 2012, nationals from the EU and the US do not require a visa for travel to Sharm El Sheikh if the visit is for fourteen days or less, although those travelling outside the Sinai area may still require a visa, which is purchasable for a small fee on arrival. Visitors are often ushered into a queue to buy a visa after entering the airport upon landing.

An investigation concluded that the missile was an Egyptian armed forces missile that had strayed from a military exercise.

Flight Metrojet Flight 9268 was destroyed by a bomb above the northern Sinai following its departure from Sharm El Sheikh International Airport, killing all 224 people on board, on October 31, 2015, while flying from Sharm El Sheikh to Saint Petersburg. Islamic State of Iraq and the Levant (ISIL) claimed responsibility for this incident. This caused the repatriation of British and Russian tourists from November 5, 2015. Following these events, many countries ordered all flights to Sharm El Sheikh be suspended. These suspensions were gradually lifted as the security situation improved, with the UK government ending its ban on direct flights on October 22, 2019. The process of lifting flight suspensions was completed on August 9, 2021, when the first direct flight from Russia since November 2015 (operated by Rossiya Airlines) landed at Sharm El Sheikh International Airport.

Transport

Lampposts on El Salaam Street use solar power.
Taxis and buses are numbered for safety.

Sharm's marina has been redeveloped for private yachts and sailing boats, with a passenger terminal for cruise ships.

The city is served by Sharm El Sheikh International Airport, the third largest airport in Egypt.

Sharm has frequent coach services to Cairo leaving from the Delta Sharm bus station.

Scuba diving and water sports
Sharm El Sheikh has become a popular location for scuba diving as a result of its underwater scenery and warm waters. Other beach activities include snorkeling, windsurfing, kite-surfing, para-sailing, boating, and canoeing.

Ras Muhammad National Park is located at the southernmost tip of the Sinai Peninsula where the waters of the Red Sea and Gulf of Suez meet, producing strong currents and providing a habitat for diverse marine life.

The Straits of Tiran are located at the mouth of the Gulf of Aqaba and in a major shipping lane. There are four reefs there, each named after one of the British cartographers who first mapped them: Gordan, Thomas, Woodhouse and Jackson. In summer months, hammerhead sharks swim in schools near the reefs.

The Sharm El Sheikh Hyperbaric Medical Center was founded in 1993 by the Egyptian Ministry of Tourism with a grant from USAID, to assist with diving-related medical conditions.

Shark attacks

On 1 December 2010, four tourists − three Russians and a Ukrainian − were attacked and injured by an oceanic whitetip shark or sharks in three separate incidents off Sharm El Sheikh. One victim lost a leg, and another an arm. The Egyptian authorities claimed that the shark responsible for the attacks had been captured alive, but the identification was disputed by the diving industry, based on eyewitness and photographic evidence. Four days later, on 5 December, an elderly German woman was attacked and killed by a shark while snorkelling at the resort.

After the closure of many flights to the destination the coral reefs have had a reduced number of divers. Changes in corals and more obviously the marine life are very positive.

Education
 St. Joseph Schools
 Fayroz Experimental School
 Geel October School
 Sharm College
 Sharm British School
 King Salman International University, Sharm El Sheikh campus

Twin towns

 Aqaba,  (since December 2015)
 Arzachena,  
 Hévíz,   (since 2013)
 Swakopmund,  (since June 2008)
 Yalta,  (since 2009)

Gallery

See also

 Red Sea Riviera
 Sharm El Sheikh Memorandum
 South Sinai Hospital
 Ras Sedr
 Ras Muhammad National Park
 Dahab
 Taba
 Nuweiba
 Flash Airlines Flight 604
 List of cities and towns in Egypt

References

External links 

 Sharm El Sheikh - Egyptian Tourism Authority

 
Populated places in South Sinai Governorate
Port cities and towns of the Red Sea
Seaside resorts in Egypt
Red Sea Riviera
Cities in Egypt
Tourist attractions in Egypt